The National Film Actors' Theatre or State Theatre of Cinema Actors (Russian - Государственный театр киноактёра) is a theatre company in Moscow, Russia, founded in December 1943 by the Council of People's Commissars to train film directors and film actors and to provide work for film actors between shoots. It is housed in a building originally built as a house of culture for political prisoners by two of the Vesnin brothers between 1931 and 1935. It is located at 33 Povarskaïa Street in the north of the Arbat District in the Central Administrative Okrug. Since 2013 its director has been V. Baycher.

References

External links
Official site

1943 establishments in the Soviet Union
Theatres in Moscow